Choujapyx is a genus of diplurans in the family Japygidae.

Species
 Choujapyx choui Huang, 2001

References

Diplura